Walter Andreas Müller (born 3 September 1945) is a Swiss stage and film actor starring usually in Swiss German language cinema and television and stage productions.

Early life and education 
Born in Zürich, canton of Zürich, in Switzerland, Walter Andreas Müller lives in the municipality of Russikon. His mother was a gifted painter and his father worked as a clarinetist and saxophonist. After a training as a bookseller and publisher, Walter Andreas Müller devoted 21 years of acting and attended acting school in Zürich.

Theater, television and cabaret 
Thenafter Müller had firm commitments on various German stages, returned to Switzerland in 1972 and worked for several years at the Theater an der Winkelwiese, and also starred on the Bernhard-Theater Zürich.

National popularity gained Müller with Ursula Schäppi in 1977 in Kurt Felix' "Teleboy" show, and as the Chifler couple; even a song was listed in the Swiss radio charts.

Walter Andreas Müller's probably most popular role is the character of Hans Meier in the Swiss comedy serial Fascht e Familie in the 1990s. Whether Gilbert Gress, Christoph Blocher or Tina Turner, he parodies all of them perfectly. But besides that, the multi-talented actor always cuts a fine figure and was present at pretty much every major theater in Switzerland. In addition, Müller still works as a freelance actor, radio host, and tours as comedian, impersonator and parodist.

Filmography (selected works) 
 2014: Tyfelstei
 1994–1999: Fascht e Familie (100 episodes)
 1975: Emil auf der Post

Awards 
 1987: Prix Walo Publikumsliebling together with Ursula Schäppi

References

External links 
 
  

1945 births
Swiss male stage actors
Swiss male film actors
20th-century Swiss male actors
Male actors from Zürich
Swiss parodists
Swiss comedians
Swiss male radio actors
People from Wetzikon
Swiss male musical theatre actors
Swiss male voice actors
Swiss satirists
Swiss male television actors
Living people
21st-century Swiss male actors